Francis De Smet (born 3 December 1963) is a Belgian film producer. He was born in Bruges.

Films
La Vie sexuelle des Belges 1950-1978 (1994) with Noël Godin; Camping Cosmos (1996) with Lolo Ferrari; The Closing Down of the Renault Factory at Vilvoorde Belgium (1998) with Louis Schweitzer ; La Vie politique des Belges (2002) with Benoît Poelvoorde; Les vacances de Noël (2005) with Yolande Moreau; all with director Jan Bucquoy.

References

External links
Transatlantic Films
American Patents
Patent "Searching on the Internet".

Belgian film producers
Living people
1963 births